Runville is an unincorporated community and census-designated place (CDP) in Centre County, Pennsylvania, United States. It was first listed as a CDP prior to the 2020 census.

The CDP is in north-central Centre County, in the western part of Boggs Township. It sits in the valley of Wallace Run, a southward-flowing tributary of Bald Eagle Creek, part of the West Branch Susquehanna River watershed. Pennsylvania Route 144 is the main road through the community; it leads south and east  to Milesburg and northwest up the Allegheny Front  to Snow Shoe.

Demographics

References 

Census-designated places in Centre County, Pennsylvania
Census-designated places in Pennsylvania